Simhallsbadet may refer to:

Simhallsbadet, Malmö, a swimming complex in Malmö, Sweden, 1988–2015 known as Aq-va-kul
Simhallsbadet, Helsingborg, swimming venue in Helsingborg, Sweden